The fourth series of Mam talent! began airing on TVN on 3 September 2011 and ended on 26 November 2011. The winner of the show was Kacper Sikora, who received PLN 300,000. Małgorzata Foremniak and Agnieszka Chylińska returned as judges. They were joined by a new judge, Robert Kozyra. He replaced Kuba Wojewódzki, who had left the show in order to focus on judging X Factor. Marcin Prokop and Szymon Hołownia returned as hosts.

Judges 

It was reported that Kuba Wojewódzki might leave the programme in order to focus on X Factor, where he also serves as a judge and does not want to be present on both shows. Media speculated that Robert Kozyra, former executive of Radio ZET, was in the running for his place on the show. Finally Kozyra was officially confirmed as judge on 7 June 2011. On 22 April 2011 Dziennik reported that Małgorzata Foremniak would return as a judge for the fourth series. Later, it was also reported that Agnieszka Chylińska would return as her maternity leave was going to end soon. She was to have signed her contract right after Easter.

Auditions 
The auditions for the fourth series took place in eight Polish cities, beginning from Zabrze on 2 April. Then, it was followed by filmed auditions with judges and audience in Katowice, Wrocław, Gdańsk, Kraków and Warsaw between 13 June and 11 July 2011. Kraków hosted auditions for the first time in show's history.

Semi-finals
The forty semi-finalists were revealed on 15 October 2011. The live shows started on Saturday 22 October.

Semi-finalists

Semi-finals summary

Semi-final 1 (22 October)
 Guest performer: Magda Welc - "Nie jesteś sama"

Semi-final 2 (29 October)

Semi-final 3 (5 November)

Semi-final 4 (12 November)

Semi-final 5 (19 November)

Final (26 November)

The live final was held on 26 November 2011. After the viewers' voting, the top three turned out to be Piotr Karpienia, Marta Podulka and Kacper Sikora. Then, it was revealed that Marta Podulka finished third. Finally, Kacper Sikora was announced as the winner and Piotr Karpienia became the runner-up. Sikora received PLN 300,000 and Karpienia was given a special prize - PLN 50,000 funded by the sponsor of Mam talent!, Komputronik.

Live show chart

Ratings
The fourth series of Mam talent! premiered on TVN on Saturday, 3 September at 8 p.m. and competed with the new TVP2 series The Voice of Poland. Najlepszy głos which also debuted at 8 p.m. TVN's show attracted the audience of 3.79 million with the share of 28.99%, while its main rival gained almost 2 million viewers with the share of 15.39%. In group "16-49" Mam talent! reached share of 33.10% and was watched by 1.7 million viewers.

Note: All ratings obtained from Nielsen Audience Measurement.

References

External links 

Official site
Unofficial site at 

Mam talent! episodes on TVN Player

3
2011 Polish television seasons